Parasicyos is a genus of flowering plants belonging to the family Cucurbitaceae.

Its native range is Eastern and Southern Mexico to El Salvador.

Species
Species:

Parasicyos dieterleae 
Parasicyos maculatus

References

Cucurbitaceae
Cucurbitaceae genera